The Alexandra Hospital is a private hospital in Cheadle, Greater Manchester, operated by BMI Healthcare. It is the largest private hospital in the UK outside London.

History
The facility was founded in 1981, and has treated a number of notable patients, including Russell Watson, Fabrice Muamba, and Alex Ferguson. Matt Busby died in the hospital in 1994.

Services
Over 600 consultants work from the hospital, offering a range of services including Orthopaedics, Cardiology, Fertility treatment, an imaging suite including CT and MRI, seven operating theatres, and a 5-bed intensive care unit. The hospital has 128 beds, all in individual en-suite rooms.

The hospital's latest inspection by the Care Quality Commission found most aspects of care to be 'Good', but the safety of its intensive care facility was judged as 'Requires Improvement'.

In 2016, the hospital was criticised for employing an anaesthetics nurse who had forged her qualifications.

In 2018 The hospital was publicly praised by Sir Alex Ferguson for the great care he received following surgery for a brain tumor.

See also
Healthcare in Greater Manchester
Private medicine in the UK
BMI Healthcare

References

External links
Official website

Private hospitals in the United Kingdom
Hospitals in Greater Manchester
Cheadle, Greater Manchester